Volutomitra obscura is a species of sea snail, a marine gastropod mollusk in the family Volutomitridae.

Description

Distribution

References

 Hutton, F. W. (1873). Catalogue of the marine Mollusca of New Zealand with diagnoses of the species. Didsbury, Wellington. xx + 116 pp
 Odhner, N.H. (1924) Papers from Dr. Th. Mortensen's Pacific Expedition 1914–1916. XIX. New Zealand Mollusca. Videnskabelige Meddelelser fra Dansk Naturhistorisk Forening i Kjobenhavn, 77, 1–90, 2 pls.
 Smith, E.A. (1898). On a small collection of marine shells from New Zealand and Macquarie Island, with descriptions of new species. Proceedings of the Malacological Society of London. 3: 20–25.
  Bouchet P. & Kantor Y. 2004. New Caledonia: the major centre of biodiversity for volutomitrid molluscs (Mollusca: Neogastropoda: Volutomitridae). Systematics and Biodiversity 1(4): 467–502
 Spencer, H.G., Marshall, B.A. & Willan, R.C. (2009). Checklist of New Zealand living Mollusca. pp 196–219. in: Gordon, D.P. (ed.) New Zealand inventory of biodiversity. Volume one. Kingdom Animalia: Radiata, Lophotrochozoa, Deuterostomia. Canterbury University Press, Christchurch.

External links
 Reeve L.A. (1844–1845). Monograph of the genus Mitra. In: Conchologia Iconica, vol. 2, pl. 1–39 and unpaginated text. L. Reeve & Co., London. [stated dates: pl. 1–7, August 1844; pl. 8–15, September 1844; pl. 16–19, October 1844; pl. 20–23, November 1844; pl. 24–27, December 1844; pl. 28–29, January 1845; pl. 30 imprinted March 1844, presumably March 1845; pl. 31–39, March 1845 

Volutomitridae
Gastropods described in 1873